Norman Howell (born May 11, 1973), better known as Notch, is an American R&B, reggae, dancehall, and reggaeton artist. He was the former lead vocalist and one of the creative forces behind the hip-hop/reggae group Born Jamericans.

He is known for his 2001 chart topper, Nuttin nuh go so. He has featured on albums such as Mas Flow 2, Mas Flow 2.5, Chosen Few II: El Documental, Barrio Fino, and The Cosmic Game.  His first solo album, Raised by the People, was released in May 2007.

Biography

Early life
Howell was born in Hartford, Connecticut. His mother is of African-American, Native American, and Portuguese descent, however his brothers and sisters, from the same mother but different father, are of Puerto Rican and African-American descent. His father was born in Jamaica and is of Afro-Cuban and French descent. Howell's parents separated when he was still an infant. He spent his early years with his mother, living in Hartford, Connecticut. Howell grew up in a multicultural neighborhood and learned Spanish because most of his friends at that time were of Hispanic descent. He left Connecticut to live with his father in Washington, D.C., when he was nine years old. Notch also spent a short time in Bermuda before moving back to Washington, D.C., where he lived until his early twenties.

Career
Notch is fluent in American English, Jamaican Patois, and Spanglish. He mixes all three dialects and languages in some songs, a mixture he calls "Spatoinglish". Notch has worked with Daddy Yankee, Luny Tunes, Voltio, Baby Ranks, Thievery Corporation, Sublime, Pitbull, T-Weaponz, and Rascalz.

Notch has provided vocals on several Thievery Corporation songs, including the title track of The Richest Man in Babylon, "Amerimacka", "Blasting Through the City" and "Strike the Root".  Four songs also appear on Thievery's Corporation's "The Temple of I & I" including "Strike the Root," "True Sons of Zion," "Weapons of Distraction," and "Drop Your Guns."

Discography

Born Jamericans
"Boom Shak-a-Tack" (1993)
"Cease & Seckle" (1994)
Kids from Foreign (1994)
Yardcore (1997)

Solo work

Raised by the People (2007)
Intro/ Hay Que Bueno 
Dale Pa' Tra (Back It Up)
Algarete 
Guaya Guaya
Que Te Pica
Layaway Love
Layaway Love Remix (feat. Fatman Scoop)
Rosalinda
Traemelo
Tocame
Más De Ti
Ella Se Fue
Castigo
No Problema
Jah Mexi Cali
Mano y Mano
Verme (Remix) - (with Baby Ranks & Jabba)
Chévere (Remix) - (with Voltio)
Bailar Reggae
Bun Out Bad Mind
Hay Que Bueno
Tú 'Tá Loco

References

External links
 PopMatters.com - Review of Thievery Corporation's album "The Richest Man in Babylon".

Jamaican reggae musicians
American reggaeton musicians
Dancehall musicians
1973 births
Living people
Musicians from Hartford, Connecticut